Bluebottle Kiss, sometimes known as BBK, are an Australian indie rock band formed in Sydney in 1993 by mainstay member Jamie Hutchings on guitar and vocals. The band issued six albums, Higher Up the Firetrails (1995), Fear of Girls (1996), Patient (1999), Revenge Is Slow (2002), Come Across (2003) and Doubt Seeds (2006) before their split in 2007.

History

Bluebottle Kiss were formed in Sydney in 1993 as a grunge trio by Ben Fletcher on bass guitar and vocals, Jamie Hutchings on lead guitar and lead vocals, and Peter Noble on drums. Their influences are from the late 1980s United States indie scene, which include Sonic Youth and the Afghan Whigs, singer-songwriters of the 1970s, Neil Young and Van Morrison, as well as the Australian independent scene with the Church and Nick Cave and the Bad Seeds. The band were signed to Murmur, an imprint of Sony Music Australia.

Their debut studio album, Higher Up the Firetrails, was issued in April 1995. It was recorded at the Bondi Pavilion Theatre with Wayne Connolly producing (Underground Lovers, You Am I). Australian musicologist, Ian McFarlane, felt they did not use a regular studio setting "to capture a certain ambience. The album ran the gamut of sounds from quiet dirge to chaotic noise." They supported shows by Beck, JSBX, Crow and Silverchair.

For the group's second album, Fear of Girls (August 1996), they used US producer, Jack Endino (Nirvana, Mudhoney, Afghan Whigs). McFarlane opined "[it] covered a lot of ground, from tough, noisy art-rock to bleak ballads." Late in 1997 Noble was replaced on drums by Richard Coneliano.

Although dropped from Murmur after the release of Somnambulist Homesick Blues in 1997, Bluebottle Kiss continued to make records on their own with various indie imprints. In 1998, Tap Dancing on the Titanic was issued on the now-dormant Troy Horse label. In 1999, Patient was released on Citadel Records, whose catalogue includes New Christs, Died Pretty, The Stems and more recently Knievel.

The band briefly moved to the US after this before regrouping as four-piece in 2001. In 2002, a long-time music fan, Nick Carr - inspired by labels such as Citadel - started his own label, Nonzero Records, to release Bluebottle Kiss' Revenge is Slow album. The album was also released in the US on the In Music We Trust label. In November of that year, Triple J's Richard Kingsmill presented a music special, "Bluebottle Kiss", for their J Files series to showcase the band's output.

The relationship between Bluebottle Kiss and Nonzero Records has endured, with the band's sixth studio album - the double album Doubt Seeds - being their third album, among numerous singles and EPs, on the label. Doubt Seeds was produced by Jamie Hutchings at Linear Recording studio in Sydney. The band went their separate ways in 2007, with Hutchings pursuing a solo career.

The band reconvened in 2022 with the Revenge Is Slow era line-up of Hutchings, Fletcher, Coneliano and Grounds. They toured Australia in October 2022 to support the reissue of Patient on vinyl.

Members 
Current members
 Jamie Hutchings – vocals, guitar, keyboards (1993–2007, 2022–present)
 Ben Fletcher – vocals, guitar, bass guitar (1993–2004, 2022–present)
 Richard Coneliano – drums, piano (1997–2002, 2022–present)
 Ben Grounds – bass guitar, guitar (2001–2007, 2022–present)

Former members
 Peter Noble – drums (1993–1997)
 Simon Fuhrer – drums (2003–2004)
 Ross Dickie – bass guitar (2004–2009)
 Jared Harrison – drums (2004–2009)

Discography

Albums

References

External links
 Official band website
 Myspace page
 Heart/Noise: The Ballad of Bluebottle Kiss - comprehensive feature article from Mess+Noise covering the band's career up until the "Doubt Seeds" tour (2006)
 Blue Road 50-minute documentary covering the band's February/March 2006 tour with Richmond Fontaine.

Musical groups disestablished in 2009
New South Wales musical groups
Australian indie rock groups
Musical groups reestablished in 2022
Musical groups established in 1993